Bruce Elliott may refer to:

 Bruce Elliott (writer) (1914–1973), American writer
 Bruce Elliott (footballer) (born 1956), Australian rules footballer
 Bruce Elliott (bridge), Canadian bridge player
 R. Bruce Elliott (born 1949), American actor and voice actor
 Bruce Elliott, painter and owner of Old Town Ale House, Chicago

See also
 Bruce Elliott-Smith, British songwriter and producer